The Ptolemaic Decrees were a series of decrees by synods of ancient Egyptian priests. They were issued in the Ptolemaic Kingdom, which controlled  Egypt from 305 BC to 30 BC. In each decree, the benefactions of the reigning pharaoh, especially towards the priesthood, are recognised, and religious honours are decreed for him.

Two decrees were issued under Ptolemy III Euergetes (the Decree of Alexandria and Decree of Canopus), another under Ptolemy IV Philopator (the Raphia Decree), and others under Ptolemy V Epiphanes (the Decree of Memphis and the two Philensis Decrees). Multiple copies of the decrees, inscribed on stone steles, were erected in temple courtyards, as specified in the text of the decrees.

There exist three copies plus a fragment of the Decree of Canopus, two copies of the Memphis Decree (one imperfect), and two and a half copies of the text of the Rosetta Stone, including the copy on the Nubayrah Stele and a pyramid wall inscription with edits, or scene replacements, completed by subsequent scribes.

243 BC Decree of Alexandria (Ptolemy III)
The Decree of Alexandria proclaimed that statues of Ptolemy III and his wife Berenice II should be set up in each temple, meaning that they would be worshipped as gods.

239 BC Decree of Canopus (Ptolemy III)
The Decree was issued on 7 Appellaios (Mac.) = 17 Tybi (Eg.) year 9 of Ptolemy III = Thursday 7 March 238 BCE (proleptic Julian calendar).

 Stone 1: Stele of Canopus, (no. 1), found 1866, 37 lines of hieroglyphs, 74 lines of Demotic (right side), 76 lines of Greek 'capitals', fine limestone.
 Stone 2: Stele of Canopus (no. 2), found 1881, 26 lines hieroglyphs, 20 lines Demotic, 64 lines Greek 'capitals', white limestone.
 3rd partial text with lines of hieroglyphs (now in the Louvre).
 4th text was discovered in 2004 at Bubastis, by the German-Egyptian 'Tell Basta Project'.

217 BC Decree of Memphis (Ptolemy IV)

 Stone 1: Raphia Decree, found 1902 at the site of ancient Memphis, hieroglyphs, Demotic, and Greek, dark granite.
 Stone 2: Pithom Stele, No. II, found 1923, hieroglyphs (front), 42 lines Demotic (back), virtually complete, providing an almost total translation, and Greek (side), sandstone.

196 BC Decree of Memphis (Ptolemy V)

 Stone 1: Stele of Rosetta, "The Rosetta Stone", found 1799, (remaining) hieroglyphs, 14 lines, 32 lines Demotic, 54 lines Greek 'capitals', dark granite (granodiorite).
 Stone 2: Nubayrah Stele, found in the early 1880s, hieroglyphs, lines 1–27 were used to complete the missing lines on the Rosetta Stone, Demotic, Greek capitals, limestone.
 Site 3: the Temple of Philae, inscribed hieroglyphs from the Third Decree on walls, also overwritten, with scenes and figures of humans/gods.

186 BC Philensis II Decree (Ptolemy V)
Issued at Alexandria upon the suppression of a revolt.

185 BC Philensis I Decree (Ptolemy V)
Issued at Memphis upon the enthronement of an Apis bull.

References

Works cited

Further reading

External links
Hellenistic Inscriptions: Egyptian Decrees in English translation

Ancient Egyptian stelas
Decrees
Ptolemaic Greek inscriptions
Multilingual texts